Wenyingzhuangia aestuarii is a Gram-negative, strictly aerobic, rod-shaped and non-motile bacterium from the genus of Wenyingzhuangia which has been isolated from water from the Heita river in Japan.

References

Flavobacteria
Bacteria described in 2016